Paul Gabriel García Oviedo is a Peruvian businessman and politician. Currently, he is a Congressman, representing Callao since March 16, 2020.

Early life and education 
García completed his primary and secondary studies in the city of Lima and in 2012 he studied technical marketing studies at the Zegel IPAE school. In 2009 he began law studies at the Pontificia Universidad Católica del Perú, unfinished to date.

From 2014 he was a student leader at the Pontificia Universidad Católica del Perú, arriving at the Federated Center of Law and the University Assembly of the PUCP.

Career 
García is affiliated with the Popular Action party. He was also a candidate for the Callao provincial mayor's office during the 2018 municipal elections. He also served as National Executive Director of the Association of Municipalities of Peru (AMPE). During the extraordinary elections of 2020, he was elected a congressman of the republic on behalf of the Constitutional Province of Callao. García was in favor of the removal of President Martín Vizcarra during the two processes that took place for it, the second of which ended up removing the former president from power. The congressman supported the motion being one of the 105 parliamentarians who voted in favor of the Removal of President Martín Vizcarra.

References 

Living people
Popular Action (Peru) politicians
Members of the Congress of the Republic of Peru
21st-century Peruvian politicians
People from Lima
Year of birth missing (living people)